Niilo Rudolf Tammisalo (originally Ekbom; 15 October 1894, Helsinki - 5 February 1982, Helsinki) was an influential figure in Finnish sports in the first half of the 20th century. He was a versatile athlete who represented Finland as a player with the national teams in football, ice hockey, and bandy; he was also on Finnish Champion teams in each of the three sports with domestic clubs. When his career as a player came to a close in the early 1930s, he dedicated himself to coaching, refereeing, teaching, and administrating sports organizations.

Tammisalo was a founding member of the Ilves Sports Club and won the Finnish Championship in ice hockey as head coach of Ilves in 1936 and 1937. He was the first chairman of Basketball Finland (1939-1943), served as head coach of the Finnish national football team (1937-38 & 1946), was a sports instructor and lecturer at the University of Helsinki (1938-1958), and served as a referee in international competitions for football, ice hockey, and bandy.

Playing career

Football 
Tammisalo played as goalkeeper at the semi-professional level with Helsingin Jalkapalloklubi (HJK) (Helsinki Football Club). He began playing on the club's representative team in 1911, when he was 17 years old, and would remain loyal to HJK throughout his sixteen-season football career, helping them achieve seven Finnish Championship Cup victories (1911, 1912, 1917, 1918, 1919, 1923 and 1925). He is credited as the first Finnish goalkeeper to knock the ball away from the goal with his fist.

Bandy 

Tammisalo was a four time Finnish Champion in bandy with HJK, in 1921, 1923, 1924 and 1928.

Ice hockey 

Tammisalo was Finnish Champion in ice hockey while playing with HJK in 1929 and with Tampereen Palloilijat (TaPa) in 1931. While acting as captain and coach of the Tampereen Ilves he won Finnish Championship bronze in 1934.

International play

Bandy 
Tammisalo played in seven games with the Finnish men's national bandy team. He participated in the particularly significant match at the 1919 Finnish Winter Games, the first game in which players represented the recently independent nation Finland. The national team's roster was dominated by players from Viipurin Sudet and Tammisalo (from HJK) was one of only three players representing a different domestic club. The national team's match against the Swedish club IFK Uppsala resulted in a 4-1 victory that was described in the press as “one of the most amazing achievements of Finnish athletes.”

Ice hockey 
Tammisalo is credited with one appearance representing Finland in international ice hockey competition, a three-game series of friendlies against the Swedish national team that were played in Stockholm in February 1933.

Non-playing career

Awards and honors 
Golden Cross of Merit of Finnish Sport
Sports Legend of Helsinki, designated by the City of Helsinki on 12 June 2019 (Helsinki Day)
Valmentajien Kunniagalleria (Finnish Hall of Coaching Excellence) inductee, 2017 (first class)
Football Association of Finland
Golden Badge honouree
Hall of Fame inductee, 1993 (first class)
Basketball Finland
Honorary President
Golden Badge honouree
Hall of Fame inductee, 2019
Helsingin Jalkapalloklubi (HJK)
HJK Centennial All-Star Team, 2009
Hall of Fame inductee, 2015

References 
Content in this article is translated from the existing Finnish Wikipedia article at :fi:Niilo Tammisalo; see its history for attribution.

External links

Images 

An HJK football match with keeper Niilo Tammisalo, date unknown. from HJK Hall of Fame
Niilo Tammisalo and Risto Tiitola, c. 1931 (Tiitola (left) is wearing Ilves' first jersey). From Ilves Hockey on Facebook.

1894 births
1982 deaths
Sportspeople from Helsinki
Finnish footballers
Association football goalkeepers
Finland international footballers
Helsingin Jalkapalloklubi players
Finnish football referees
Finnish football managers
Finnish bandy players
Finnish ice hockey forwards
Finnish ice hockey officials
Ilves players